Mariya Grigorova  (born 4 March 1996) is a Kazakhstani alpine skier. 
She competed in slalom and giant slalom at the 2018 Winter Olympics.

References

1996 births
Living people
Kazakhstani female alpine skiers 
Olympic alpine skiers of Kazakhstan 
Alpine skiers at the 2018 Winter Olympics 
Alpine skiers at the 2017 Asian Winter Games
Alpine skiers at the 2012 Winter Youth Olympics
Competitors at the 2019 Winter Universiade